Alfred Louis Kivell (12 April 1897 – 1 September 1987) was a New Zealand rugby union player. A loose forward, Kivell represented  at a provincial level between 1920 and 1930. He was a member of the New Zealand national side, the All Blacks, on their 1929 tour of Australia, playing in five matches including two internationals.

Sources vary as to Kivell's place of birth: either Tararu, near Thames; or Karangahake, near Paeroa. Kivell enlisted as a rifleman in the New Zealand Rifle Brigade in March 1917, and served with the New Zealand Expeditionary Force in France in the last months of World War I. He died  on 1 September 1987.

References

1897 births
1987 deaths
People educated at Stratford High School, New Zealand
New Zealand rugby union players
New Zealand international rugby union players
Taranaki rugby union players
Rugby union flankers
New Zealand military personnel of World War I